David Rutherford (born April 30, 1987) is a Canadian professional ice hockey forward who last played for Diables Rouges de Briançon in the Ligue Magnus. Rutherford was previously with the Belfast Giants of the Elite Ice Hockey League (EIHL).

Playing career
Rutherford played Junior Hockey in the PJHL, BCHL, and WHL.  He played for the Abbotsford Pilots in the PJHL, the Penticton Panthers, Chilliwack Chiefs, and Surrey Eagles in the BCHL, and the Vancouver Giants and Spokane Chiefs in the WHL.

On December 7, 2009, Rutherford signed with the Bossier-Shreveport Mudbugs of the Central Hockey League, for which he would play for the 2009–10 season and 2010–11 season.  Rutherford won the Ray Miron President's Cup championship with the Mudbugs for the 2010–11 season.  On July 26, 2011, Rutherford returned to the ECHL by signing with the Florida Everblades.

On August 6, 2012, Rutherford signed a two-way AHL/ECHL contract with the Charlotte Checkers of the American Hockey League, which coincidentally was affiliated with Rutherford's prior team, the Florida Everblades.  Rutherford split the 2012–13 season between the Checkers and Everblades, accumulating 38 points on 16 goals and 22 assists in 36 games with the Everblades, while accumulating 7 points with 1 goal and 6 assists in 18 games with the Checkers.

On August 19, 2013, Rutherford left the Everblades and signed with the Orlando Solar Bears of the ECHL.

On December 28, 2013, Rutherford was traded to the Fort Wayne Komets in exchange for Mickey Lang.  He refused to report, however, and then signed with the Arizona Sundogs of the CHL.

On June 18, 2014, Rutherford signed with Visby/Roma HK of Hockeyettan, but was released by the team on September 14, 2014. On October 9, 2014, Rutherford signed with the Missouri Mavericks of the ECHL. On January 22, 2014, Rutherford was traded to the Ontario Reign of the ECHL in exchange for Right Wing Geoff Walker.

On August 17, 2015, Rutherford signed his first contract abroad agreeing to a one-year contract with Scottish club Edinburgh Capitals of the Elite Ice Hockey League.

Rutherford left Edinburgh in January 2016, signing for Belfast Giants. Rutherford later agreed an extension to remain with the team for the 2016–17 season.

In July 2017, Rutherford announced his retirement from hockey. However, in November 2017, Rutherford reversed his decision and re-signed with Belfast until the end of the 2017/18 season. Rutherford remained in Belfast until the end of the 2018/19 season, before signing for Hungarian side DEAC of the Erste Liga in October 2019.

For the 2020/21 season, Rutherford moved to France to sign for Ligue Magnus side Diables Rouges de Briançon.

Career statistics

References

External links

1987 births
Living people
Arizona Sundogs players
Bossier-Shreveport Mudbugs players
Canadian ice hockey forwards
Charlotte Checkers (1993–2010) players
Charlotte Checkers (2010–) players
Chilliwack Chiefs players
Florida Everblades players
Ice hockey people from British Columbia
Missouri Mavericks players
Ontario Reign (ECHL) players
Penticton Panthers players
Phoenix RoadRunners players
Spokane Chiefs players
Surrey Eagles players
Vancouver Giants players
Edinburgh Capitals players
Belfast Giants players
Diables Rouges de Briançon players
Canadian expatriate ice hockey players in Northern Ireland
Canadian expatriate ice hockey players in Scotland
Canadian expatriate ice hockey players in France
Canadian expatriate ice hockey players in the United States
Canadian expatriate ice hockey players in Hungary
Debreceni EAC (ice hockey) players